Grand Lake is a lake located in central New Brunswick, Canada. It is approximately 40 kilometres east of Fredericton; and the province's largest open body of water being a total of 20 kilometers long and 5 kilometres wide. The lake drains through the Jemseg River and the Grand Lake Meadows into the Saint John River.

Records indicate that by the early 1600s [Grand Lake] was inhabited by Maliseet and Mi’kmaq peoples. The traditional word for Grand Lake is "Kchee'quis" meaning Big Lake.

Commercial barges of forest products were towed across the lake from a large sawmill in Chipman to a pulp mill in Saint John until the late 1990s. Other commercial activities included New Brunswick's largest coal mining area with extensive strip mines in the Newcastle Creek valley. In the 1850s, significant amounts of 'Newcastle coal' was being shipped down river from Grand Lake to the Saint John River. This was a coal-fired power generating station that was built in 1931 and was torn down in 2012, it was formerly operated by NB Power, and is located on the lake shore near the village of Minto.

Today, the lake is popular for recreational activities for both locals and visitors, with several beaches, cottages, and campgrounds along its shores. This large body of water acts as a heat sink, moderating local temperatures and creating the warmest climate in the province which extends the growing season.
There is a small aerodrome, Cumberland Bay Water Aerodrome, located in a bay of the same name on the east shore of the lake.

Communities along or near Grand Lake include:

Minto
Princess Park
Grand Lake West
Douglas Harbour
Jemseg
Mill Cove
Youngs Cove
Cumberland Bay
Waterborough

Campgrounds along or near Grand Lake include:

Grand Lake Campground
Princess Park
Mohawk Camping
Lakeside Campground

Lakes and rivers which drain into Grand Lake include:

Newcastle Creek
Salmon River
Coal Creek
Cumberland Bay Stream
Maquapit Lake

See also
List of lakes of New Brunswick

References

Lakes of New Brunswick
Landforms of Queens County, New Brunswick